Frigga is a genus of jumping spiders that was first described by Carl Ludwig Koch in 1850. The name is derived from Frigga, a Norse goddess.

Species
 it contains ten species, found in South America, Australia, Guatemala, Mexico, and on the Polynesian Islands:
Frigga coronigera (C. L. Koch, 1846) (type) – Brazil
Frigga crocuta (Taczanowski, 1878) – Peru, Ecuador, Galapagos Is., Australia (Queensland), French Polynesia (Marquesas Is., Society Is.)
Frigga finitima Galiano, 1979 – Bolivia, Argentina
Frigga flava (F. O. Pickard-Cambridge, 1901) – Guatemala
Frigga kessleri (Taczanowski, 1871) – Brazil, Guyana, French Guiana
Frigga opulenta Galiano, 1979 – Ecuador, Peru
Frigga pratensis (Peckham & Peckham, 1885) – Mexico to Colombia
Frigga quintensis (Tullgren, 1905) – Argentina, Brazil
Frigga rufa (Caporiacco, 1947) – Guyana, Brazil
Frigga simoni (Berland, 1913) – Ecuador

Gallery

References

External links

 Photographs of Frigga species (kessleri?) from Brazil
 Paintings of F. pratensis

Salticidae genera
Salticidae
Spiders of Australia
Spiders of Central America
Spiders of Mexico
Spiders of South America
Taxa named by Carl Ludwig Koch